The Gäubodenvolksfest in Straubing is one of the largest Volksfests (beer festival and travelling funfair) in the German state of Bavaria. It is an annual event, spanning eleven days mid-August.

History 
The Gäubodenvolksfest was founded in the year 1812 by Maximilian I Joseph, King of Bavaria, as an agricultural festival to foster an annual gathering of the people in the Danube region.

The festival went on hiatus in 1915-18, 1940-45 & 2020-21.

Description 
The Gäubodenvolksfest is a modern and family-friendly festival with several attractions, including carousels and roller coasters. There are also several large beer tents that span a 100,000 m2 area. The event has maintained the historic character of Bavarian festivals, and attracts approximately 1.4 million visitors every year. Many visitors wear traditional Bavarian clothing (Tracht) for the occasion.

The festival combines Bavarian tradition with progress and vitality. It is one of Bavaria's oldest and most popular festivals and it has increased to one of the biggest events in Germany. Beer plays a central role in the fair. The beer is specially brewed, and only breweries from Straubing or the district Straubing-Bogen are allowed to serve beer there.

On the first day of the festival there is a "Bierprobe", which means "beer tasting," followed by a parade consisting of people wearing Bavarian native attire walking on foot, riding horses, or in horse carriages.

On the second day there is the official opening with a representative of the Bavarian or German government.

The festival is held every year in the middle of August and lasts 11 days. The festival is celebrated by the whole city as a "fifth season", and many companies are closed down during this time.

Combined with the Gäubodenvolksfest is the Ostbayernschau, the biggest trade show of eastern Bavaria.

Statistics (2017)
 Number of visitors: 1.35 million
 Beer: 730,000 litre
 Breweries: 7 with 26,400 seats
 Length: 2,500 metres
 Price of a one-liter mug of beer (Maß): €9,15

Main Attractions/Festival Events 
 Olympia Looping (appears once every two or three years)
 Star World (appears once every two or three years)
 Wilde Maus
 Feuer und Eis (Fire and Ice)
 Free fall tower
 Chairoplane
 Bumper cars
 Transformer
 Bavarian Big Wheel
 Whitewater channel
 Horse riding
 Children and family friendly carousels
 Revues and shows
 Bavarian and international food and beverages
 A parade with Bavarian and international folklore and beer carriages
 A romantic parade with boats, swimmers, and torches on the Danube
 A boxing match and other sport events
 Two fireworks displays
 The beer tents with Bavarian folk music and mood music

Dates of Previous/ Upcoming Events 
 2020: 7 to 17 August (not held, COVID-19 pandemic)
 2021: 13 to 23 August (not held)
 2022: 12 to 22 August
 2023: 11 to 21 August
 2024: 9 to 19 August

Beer tents 
Weckmann
Brewery:, Röhrl Straubing

Krönner
Brewery: Irlbacher, Irlbach

Lechner
Brewery: Irlbacher, Irlbach

Nothaft
Brewery: Karmeliten, Straubing

Reisinger
Brewery: Arcobräu, Moos

Wenisch
Brewery: Erl-Bräu, Geiselhöring

Greindl
Brewery: Karmeliten, Straubing

References

External links 

 Official Website of the Gäubodenvolksfest
 Information in English about Gäubodenvolksfest
 A lot of pictures about the people, the fun, the beer tents, the nice atmosphere, the ostbayernschau-fair, the rides and so on ... 
 gäubodenvolksfest.de
 Photos Gäubodenvolksfest
 Lechners Schmankerlzelt
 Wenisch
 Reisinger
 Krönner
 Ochsenbraterei Beck 
 Nothaft
 Röhrlbräu

Beer festivals in Germany
Culture of Altbayern
Tourist attractions in Bavaria
1812 establishments in Bavaria
Annual events in Germany
Festivals established in 1812
Straubing